Aaron Hunt (born 4 September 1986) is a German former professional footballer who played as an attacking midfielder. 

He spent most of his career at Werder Bremen, making his first-team debut at the age of 18. In the Bundesliga, he also represented VfL Wolfsburg and Hamburger SV, winning the DFB-Pokal with the first club as well as the second.

Hunt won three caps for Germany, his first coming in 2009.

Club career

Werder Bremen
Hunt was born in Goslar, Lower Saxony. After spending his first season at Werder Bremen in the reserves the year the first team achieved the double, he made his Bundesliga debut on 18 September 2004, coming on as a substitute in a 3–0 home win against Hannover 96. On his first appearance in the starting line-up, against Borussia Mönchengladbach on 12 February 2005, he scored his first goal, becoming the club's youngest-ever goalscorer at the age of 18 years and 161 days.

Early in 2006, Hunt suffered a mysterious knee injury, which after some months was found to be bursitis. As a result, he missed the remainder of the season following the winter break. In November, he renewed his contract until 2010 and, on 3 March 2007, netted a hat-trick in the 3–0 league victory over VfL Bochum. He finished that campaign with nine goals, and his team eventually ranked third behind VfB Stuttgart and Schalke 04.

Hunt scored a career-best 11 goals in 2012–13, but Werder could only finish in 14th place. In March 2014, after being awarded a penalty during a match against 1. FC Nürnberg, he successfully asked the referee to reverse his decision, because the opposition player had not touched him.

VfL Wolfsburg
On 26 May 2014, Hunt signed for VfL Wolfsburg. He made his debut for his new club on 17 August in a 5–4 penalty shoot–out win against Darmstadt 98 in the DFB-Pokal, being replaced at the start of extra time. His first league appearance came five days later, in a 2–1 loss at Bayern Munich.

Hunt scored his first goal for the Wolves on 21 September 2014, in a 4–1 defeat of Bayer Leverkusen at the Volkswagen Arena. He made his European debut the following week in a 4–1 loss to Everton, and netted for the first time in the UEFA Europa League on 6 November of that year, his brace helping the hosts to a 5–1 rout of Krasnodar; he finished the season with four goals in 22 competitive appearances.

Hamburger SV
On 31 August 2015, having already played the two first matches of the new season with Wolfsburg, Hunt joined Hamburger SV. He finished his first year at Volksparkstadion with one goal in 21 matches, scoring four goals from 26 total games the following campaign.

Hunt made 30 appearances in all competitions in 2017–18 (29 in the league), netting three times as the club was relegated to the 2. Bundesliga for the first time in its history. In the ensuing off-season, he was made new team captain after stripping Gōtoku Sakai of that role.

After Hunt's contract was not extended, he announced his retirement in February 2022 at the age of 35. He played over 400 league matches in the top three tiers of the German league pyramid.

International career
Having a German father and an English mother, Hunt was eligible to play for both Germany or England. His mother's family all hailed from the London area, and his grandfather went to the same north-east school as Bobby Charlton. However, Hunt stated that he would only play for his birth nation. When asked which team he would represent at international level, he said he was '... honoured about this. But I have decided to play for Germany. ...', adding that he was steadfast on his decision.

In October 2006, Hunt appeared for the German under-21s in a 1–0 loss against England in Coventry for the 2007 UEFA European Championship qualification playoff (eventually 3–0 on aggregate). In November 2006, Hunt was charged by UEFA for serious unsporting behaviour, after complaints of racist remarks in the second leg of the under-21 playoff against England. He was banned for two games but, following an appeal, the decision was reversed.

On 6 November 2009, he was called up to the full side for two friendlies with Chile and Ivory Coast to be held during that month, making his debut in the latter after coming on late in the game for Bastian Schweinsteiger (the former had been cancelled following Robert Enke's suicide). His third and last international was the friendly against Ecuador in May 2013. The German national team won in Boca Raton against the South Americans 4-2.

Career statistics

Honours
Werder Bremen
DFB-Pokal: 2008–09
DFB-Ligapokal: 2006
UEFA Cup runner-up: 2008–09

VfL Wolfsburg
DFB-Pokal: 2014–15

References

External links
 
 
 
 
 

1986 births
Living people
People from Goslar
German people of English descent
German footballers
Footballers from Lower Saxony
Association football midfielders
Bundesliga players
2. Bundesliga players
SV Werder Bremen II players
SV Werder Bremen players
VfL Wolfsburg players
Hamburger SV players
Germany youth international footballers
Germany under-21 international footballers
Germany international footballers